Sian Lloyd or Siân Lloyd may refer to:

Sian Lloyd (news presenter) (born 1968), Welsh television news presenter
Siân Lloyd (born 1958), Welsh weather presenter on television

See also
Shan Lloyd, British journalist